Pershing Middle School may refer to:
Pershing Middle School (Houston)
Pershing Middle School (San Diego) - San Diego Unified School District
Pershing Middle School (Springfield, Missouri) - Springfield Public Schools